Hindley Green is an electoral ward in Wigan, England. It forms part of Wigan Metropolitan Borough Council, as well as the parliamentary constituency of Makerfield.

Councillors 
The ward is represented by three councillors: Robert Brierley (Ind), Francis Carmichael (Lab), and Paul Maiden (Ind).

References

Wigan Metropolitan Borough Council Wards